Two human polls and a committee's selections comprise the 2020 National Collegiate Athletic Association (NCAA) Division I Football Bowl Subdivision (FBS) football rankings, in addition to various publications' preseason polls. Unlike most sports, college football's governing body, the NCAA, does not bestow a national championship at the FBS level. Instead, that title is bestowed by one or more different polling agencies. There are two main weekly polls that begin in the preseason—the AP Poll and the Coaches Poll. One additional poll, the College Football Playoff (CFP) ranking, is usually released starting midway through the season. The CFP rankings determine who makes the four-team playoff that determines the College Football Playoff National Champion. Due to scheduling impact from the COVID-19 pandemic, release of CFP rankings during the 2020 season was adjusted to have the first rankings issued on November 24 and the final rankings issued on December 20.

Legend

AP Poll

*Teams whose season had been suspended were still ranked in the preseason poll; such teams were not considered after Week 1.

Coaches Poll

CFP rankings
The initial 2020 College Football Playoff rankings were released on Tuesday, November 24, 2020.

Criticism
In the Week 15 CFP rankings, the committee was widely criticized for dropping the Florida Gators only one spot from No. 6 to No. 7 following their home loss to a losing–record, unranked LSU Tigers team that was starting a freshman quarterback for the first time. Some also criticized the committee for undervaluing the undefeated Cincinnati Bearcats (dropped from No. 8 to No. 9 behind three two–loss teams) and for overvaluing the two–loss Iowa State Cyclones (rose from No. 7 to No. 6 despite two losses, including being defeated by the one-loss, No. 19-ranked Louisiana Ragin' Cajuns, 31–14).

Notes

References

Rankings
NCAA Division I FBS football rankings
Rankings